The Responsibilities Program was the code name for a Federal Bureau of Investigation program active from 1951 to 1955. Under this program the FBI would give reports about possible subversives to state governors and civic leaders.

References 

Federal Bureau of Investigation operations
McCarthyism
1950s in the United States